Ernest C. Withers (August 7, 1922 – October 15, 2007) was an African-American photojournalist.  He documented over 60 years of African-American history in the segregated Southern United States, with iconic images of the Montgomery bus boycott, Emmett Till, Memphis sanitation strike, Negro league baseball, and musicians including those related to Memphis blues and Memphis soul. 

Withers's work has been archived by the Library of Congress and has been slated for the permanent collection of the Smithsonian Institution's National Museum of African American History and Culture, in Washington, D.C.

Biography

Early life
Ernest C. Withers was born in Memphis, Tennessee, to Arthur Withers and Pearl Withers of Marshall County, Mississippi; he had a step-mother known as Mrs. Minnie Withers.  Withers exhibited interest in photography from a young age. He took his first photograph in high school after his sister gave him a camera she received from a classmate. He met his wife Dorothy Curry of Brownsville, Tennessee (they remained married for 66 years), at Manassas High School in Memphis, Tennessee.

During World War II, he received training at the Army School of Photography. After the war, Withers served as one of Memphis' first African-American police officers.

Personal life
Withers and his wife Dorothy had eight children together (seven boys and one girl, Rosalind Withers). He also had a second daughter from Memphis, Tennessee, named Frances Williams. All of his sons accompanied him as apprentice photographers at different points in his career, including Ernest, Jr., Perry O., Clarence (Joshua), E., Wendell J., Dedrick (Teddy) J., Dyral L., and Andrew (Rome). His business was called Withers Photography Studio.

Withers enjoyed traveling, visiting family members and entertaining guests at his home, including Brock Peters, Jim Kelly, Eartha Kitt, Alex Haley, Ivan van Sertima, Stokley Carmichael (Kwame Ture), and many others from the entertainment world and black consciousness movement. He attended Gospel Temple Baptist Church in Memphis, Tennessee. He was also an all-round (high-school to professional) sports enthusiast.

Career
Withers was active for approximately 60 years, with his most noted work being the images captured of the Civil Rights Movement.

He traveled with Martin Luther King Jr. during his public life.  Withers's coverage of the Emmett Till murder trial brought national attention to the racial violence taking place during the 1950s in Mississippi, among other places.  Withers appeared in a TV documentary about the murdered 14-year-old entitled The American Experience: The Murder of Emmett Till.

Withers served as official photographer for Stax Records for 20 years.

Between 1 million and 5 million images are estimated to have been taken during Withers's career, with current efforts in progress for preservation and digitization.

Death
In 2007, Withers died from the complications of a stroke in his hometown of Memphis.

FBI Document Release
In 2013, the FBI released documents relating to Withers in response to a Freedom of Information Act (FOIA) request by a Memphis newspaper, The Commercial Appeal. 

The FBI documents start in 1946 with the FBI investigating Withers as a possible communist, as he was a member of the United Negro Allied Veterans of America (UNAVA) after serving in World War II, and the group was alleged by the FBI at the time to have communist ties.  The FBI investigation of Withers as a potential communist extended through 1948, concluding with their outreach to an "informant" labeled T-3 that provided information that Withers no longer had ties to the United Negro Allied Veterans of America.

ME 338-R(Ghetto) was referenced as an "informant" for two years, 1968 through the final report in 1970, with 19 reports that include some reference to the informant.  A total of 10 pictures were provided by the informant in the released documents.

A 1968 document contains the first reference to an informant, ME 338-R (Ghetto), widely believed to be a reference to Withers and inferred by the FBI's responses to FOIA court actions.  ME 338-R(Ghetto) was questioned and queried for general information, and provided a total of approximately 10 photographs alongside brief descriptions of publicly known meetings and events.  There is limited specific information, commonly relating to a militant group named the Invaders.  ME 338-R(Ghetto) recorded the violence and connections of the Invaders including a leaflet on the manufacturing of firebombs, and links to prostitution.

Withers died years before the FOIA request was made, thus no direct response was possible.  However, at the 2000 Withers exhibition at the Chrysler Museum of Art in Norfolk, Virginia, Withers said he had FBI agents regularly looking over his shoulder and questioning him. "I never tried to learn any high powered secrets," Withers said. "It would have just been trouble.…[The FBI] was pampering me to catch whatever leaks I dropped, so I stayed out of meetings where decisions were being made."

Civil rights leader Andrew Young commented after the release of the FBI file: "The movement was transparent and didn't have anything to hide anyway."

A later book authored by Preston Lauterbauch discussed Withers brief encounter with the FBI, and explained that he likely saw the Federal Government and thus the FBI as protection at that moment for the civil rights movement, as the FBI during the time had helped the civil rights movement in Memphis in a voting discrimination case of which Withers covered through photography.  It was also the Federal government that deployed the National Guard to protect the Little Rock Nine, which was also photographed and witnessed by Withers. Additionally, a member of the Invaders, John B. Smith, of which Withers was cited to have provided information, harshly criticized initial reporting on the topic and remarked about Withers that "I think he deserves a statue somewhere".

Ernest Withers Museum and Collection
The Ernest Withers Museum and Collection opened in Memphis, Tennessee, on Beale Street in May 2011. The Museum features images of Ernest Withers spanning the eras of his work, while the complete archive is held in an offsite location.  The Withers Museum and Collection is approximately 7,000 square feet.

Publications

See also
 List of photographers of the civil rights movement

References

External links
"Withers Collection Museum and Gallery" - Official Withers Collection Museum and Gallery Website
Obituary in The Times, October 27, 2007
"FBI, not Ernest Withers, was out to get MLK" - Op-ed by USA Today
"Civil Rights Photographer Recast As FBI Informant" - slideshow by NPR
 Tri State Defender, September 2010 edition, front page.

African-American photographers
American photojournalists
Sports photographers
1922 births
2007 deaths
People from Memphis, Tennessee
Memphis blues
Negro league baseball
American municipal police officers
Journalists from Tennessee
Federal Bureau of Investigation informants
20th-century American journalists
American male journalists
20th-century African-American people
21st-century African-American people
United States Army personnel of World War II